Andries Stephanus du Plessis (1 October 1910 – 12 October 1979) was a South African track and field athlete who competed in the 1936 Summer Olympics. He was born in Germiston.

In 1936 he finished 17th in the Olympic pole vault event. At the 1934 Empire Games he finished fourth in the pole vault competition. He also participated in the 120 yards hurdles contest but was eliminated in the heats. Four years later he won the gold medal in the pole vault event at the 1938 Empire Games in Sydney.

References

External links

1910 births
1979 deaths
Sportspeople from Germiston
South African male pole vaulters
South African male hurdlers
Olympic athletes of South Africa
Athletes (track and field) at the 1934 British Empire Games
Athletes (track and field) at the 1936 Summer Olympics
Athletes (track and field) at the 1938 British Empire Games
Commonwealth Games gold medallists for South Africa
Commonwealth Games medallists in athletics
Afrikaner people
Medallists at the 1938 British Empire Games